Charaxes galawadiwosi is a butterfly in the family Nymphalidae. It is found in Ethiopia. The habitat consists of thornbush savanna (thornbush = Vachellia).

The larvae feed on Albizia species.

References

External links
Charaxes galawadiwosi images at Consortium for the Barcode of Life
Charaxes galawadiwosi f. carolinae images at BOLD
Charaxes galawadiwosi f. galawadiwosi images at BOLD
Charaxes galawadiwosi f. genovefae images at BOLD
Charaxes galawadiwosi f. katema images at BOLD
Charaxes galawadiwosi f. leonardi images at BOLD

Butterflies described in 1979
galawadiwosi
Endemic fauna of Ethiopia
Butterflies of Africa